Julius Villiam Gudmand-Høyer (13 June 1841 – 8 September 1915) was a Danish teacher, librarian, novelist, and playwright. Gudmand-Høyer's works are considered to belong to a genre called , which flourished in Denmark from the middle of the 19th century to the First World War.

Selected works

Novels 
 Den hvide Pige paa Bogø (The White Girl on Bogø)
 Katrine Kulovn 
 Kjærligheds Sejr (Victory of Love)
 Sorte Ellen og Hendes Søn (Black Ellen and her Son, later dramatized)

Plays 
 To Fortællinger (Two Tales)
 Don Juan i Knibe (Don Juan in Trouble)
 Frieri ved Kommisjonær (Courtship by Commissioner)

Edited collections 
 Nye og gamle Viser af og for Danske Folk (New and old Shows by and for Danish People)
 Fortegnelse over den classenske bogsamling i Nykjøbing paa Falster (List of the classical book collection in Nykjøbing on Falster)

References 

1841 births
1915 deaths
Danish male writers
19th-century Danish dramatists and playwrights
19th-century Danish novelists
20th-century Danish dramatists and playwrights
20th-century Danish novelists